Dingman's Ferry Dutch Reformed Church is a historic Dutch Reformed church located on U.S. Route 209 in the Delaware Water Gap National Recreation Area at Dingman's Ferry, Delaware Township, Pike County, Pennsylvania. It was designed in 1837, and built in 1850 in the Greek Revival style. It is a two-story, clapboard clad frame building with a gable roof.  It features a large gabled portico supported by four heavy Doric order columns.

According to the National Park Service, "The Greek Revival style Dutch Reform Church was built in 1850. Its wooden colossal temple front with four heavy fluted columns mimics the stone architecture of ancient Greece. It was converted to a residence in 1957 and has been home to antiques dealer Doug Cosh since 1972. He has leased the property since 1986."

It was added to the National Register of Historic Places in 1979.

References

External links

 Dutch Reformed Church, Dingmans Ferry, Pike County, PA: 2 photos, 6 data pages, and 1 photo caption page, at Historic American Buildings Survey

Churches on the National Register of Historic Places in Pennsylvania
Former Dutch Reformed churches in the United States
Churches in Pike County, Pennsylvania
Dutch-American culture in Pennsylvania
National Register of Historic Places in Pike County, Pennsylvania
Former churches in Delaware